Raceland was a 220-acre estate in Framingham, Massachusetts owned by John R. Macomber. The estate contained Macomber's residence, stables, dog kennels, as well as a horse track, steeplechase course, and golf course.

Original building
Raceland was built in 1925. It was designed by the firm of Parker, Thomas & Rice. The original structure was a 150 feet long wooden frame building with a slate roof. Macomber's residence was located on one end of the building and the stable was located at the other. There was also a half mile track, a 7/8ths of a mile steeplechase course, and an enclosed area for spectators. Beginning in 1927, Macomber opened Raceland to the public free of charge for one day of the annual horse meet. By 1930 the meet attracted 29,200 spectators. On August 1, 1930, a fire that started in the hayloft resulted in $200,000 worth of damage as well as the death of Macomber's favorite dog. The only thing left of the buildings were the foundations.

Second structure
During the winter of 1930-31, work was begun to rebuild Raceland. The stables and club house were built with the same plans, but instead used brick, stile, steel, and concrete to make the structure more fire resistant. The club house was also enlarged. The steeple of Macomber's home was topped by a weather vane depicting his most famous horse, Petee-Wrack.

Later years
Thoroughbred racing continued at Raceland until 1935, when Suffolk Downs opened. Raceland continued to host a number of other events including the Framingham District Kennel Club Dog Show - New England's largest outdoor dog show. In 1939 it was the site of the first meeting of the Vintage Motor Car Club of America. Scenes for the 1959 film The Man in the Net were filmed at Raceland. From 1959 to 1967 it was the site of the Millwood Hunt Club horse show.

Macomber died on May 11, 1955 at the age of 80. His will provided for the contiunace of Raceland to care for his horses and dogs for the rest of their lives. Never married, he left much of his estate to the Massachusetts Society for the Prevention of Cruelty to Animals. In 1981, the Massachusetts Society for the Prevention of Cruelty to Animals reopened Raceland as the Macomber Farm, a working farm and educational facility. The farm closed in 1986 and was purchased by a developer who constructed single family homes on the property.

References

Buildings and structures completed in 1925
Buildings and structures completed in 1931
Buildings and structures demolished in 1986
Buildings and structures in Framingham, Massachusetts
Burned buildings and structures in the United States
Defunct horse racing venues in Massachusetts
MSPCA-Angell
Sports in Framingham, Massachusetts
Sports venues in Middlesex County, Massachusetts